Héctor Ronaldo Sánchez Camaras (commonly known as Ronaldo Sánchez (born 24 April 1997) is a Bolivian international footballer who plays as a midfielder for Bolivian club Oriente Petrolero.

Career
He made his professional debut for Club Atlético Ciclón on September 26, 2016 in a two-goal draw against Nacional Potosí. After transferring to Oriente Petrolero he made his debut for his new club on 20 May 2017 against The Strongest. On September 14 of that year he scored his first goal in a 1-1 draw against Bolívar in La Paz. During the 2019 season Sanchez signed for The Strongest. He was suspended by the club for indiscipline following a late return back to the club from a visit back to his home in Santa Cruz. In January 2020 he returned to his previous club Oriente Petrolero.

International career
On 27 March 2018, Sanchez debuted for the senior Bolivia national football team, starting an international friendly against Curaçao. In September 2020, Sanchez along with club teammates Ferddy Roca and Mateo Zoch left the national team squad by order of their club Oriente Petrolero president Ronald Raldes.

References

1997 births
Living people
Bolivian footballers
Sportspeople from Santa Cruz de la Sierra
Association football midfielders
Club Atlético Ciclón players
Oriente Petrolero players
The Strongest players
Bolivian Primera División players
Bolivia international footballers
Bolivia youth international footballers